NGC 4984 is an intermediate lenticular galaxy exhibiting a double ring structure in the constellation Virgo. It is a member of the NGC 4856 Group of galaxies, which is a member of the Virgo II Groups, a series of galaxies and galaxy clusters strung out from the southern edge of the Virgo Supercluster. In December 2011, supernova 2011iy was discovered in it.

References

External links

Lenticular galaxies
Virgo (constellation)
4984
45585